Hypericum kouytchense, the large-flowered St John’s wort, is a species of flowering plant in the family Hypericaceae, native to Western China. Flowers are followed by red seed capsules in autumn. Where conditions are favourable it can retain its leaves all year.

The Latin specific epithet kouytchense is a westernisation of Guizhou, a southwestern province of China identified as a hotspot for biodiversity.

In the UK it has gained the Royal Horticultural Society’s Award of Garden Merit. 
It has been reported as invasive in Hawaii.

References

Flora of China
kouytchense